The city of Mumbai consists of two distinct regions: Mumbai City district and Mumbai Suburban district, which form two separate revenue districts of Maharashtra. The city district region is also commonly referred to as the Island City or South Mumbai. Mumbai Suburban district lies to the north of Mumbai City district and comprises all of Mumbai's suburbs. The western part of the Mumbai Suburban district forms the Western Suburbs and the eastern portion forms the Eastern Suburbs. The suburbs of Chembur, Govandi, Mankhurd and Trombay lie to the south-east of the Eastern Suburbs. These suburbs are generally not considered as part of the Eastern Suburbs and are sometimes referred to as the "Harbour Suburbs".

The total area of Mumbai is 603.4 km2 (233 sq mi). Of this, the island city spans 67.79 km2 (26 sq mi), while the suburban district spans 370 km2 (143 sq mi), together accounting for 437.71 km2 (169 sq mi) under the administration of Brihanmumbai Municipal Corporation (BMC). The remaining area belongs to Defence, Mumbai Port Trust, Atomic Energy Commission and Borivali National Park, which are out of the jurisdiction of the BMC. Mumbai lies at the mouth of the Ulhas River on the western coast of India, in the coastal region known as the Konkan. It sits on Salsette Island, partially shared with the Thane district. Mumbai is bounded by the Arabian Sea to the west. Borivali National Park is located partly in the Mumbai suburban district, and partly in the Thane district, and it extends over an area of 103.09 km2 (39.80 sq mi).

Western Suburbs

Andheri
Amboli
Chakala
D.N. Nagar
Four Bungalows
JB Nagar
Lokhandwala 
Marol
Model Town
Oshiwara
Poonam Nagar
Sahar
Saki Naka
Seven Bungalows
Versova

Bandra 
Bandra Kurla Complex
Bandstand Promenade
Gandhi Nagar
M I G Colony
Kherwadi
Bharat Nagar
Land's End
Pali Hill
Old Town
Bandra Reclamation
Chapel Avenue
KC Marg
Carter Road
Kala Nagar
Naupada
Nirmal Nagar
WEH Western Express Highway
Valmiki Nagar
Sadguru Colony
Bharam Nagar
Subhash Nagar
Sanjay Nagar
Sant Dnyaneshwar Nagar
Bairam Naupada
Patkar Blocks
Vaidya Nagar
Santosh Nagar
Saint Martin Road
Saint Andrew Road
Bandra Fort
Saint Paul Road
Guru Nanak Road
Mount Mary Road
Saint Josephs Road
Rizvi Complex 
Ranwar
D'Monte Park Road
Perry Cross Road
Tata Blocks
Indiraji Nagar
Somnath lane
Bandra Terminus
28th Road
1st Road
9th Road
Saint Cyril Road
SG Joshi Marg
B Block BKC
National Library Road
Bandra Worli Sea Link
Manuel Gonsalves Road
Pandurang Ashram Marg
Chimbai Road
Hill Road
Pereira Road
BJ Road
DR. Ambedkar Road
St. Sebastian Road
Mount Carmel Road
Vastu
Galaxy Apartment
Pali Mala Road

Borivali

Borivali (West) 
 I.C. Colony
 L.I.C. Colony aka Jeevan Bhima Nagar
 Eksar Colony
 Shimpoli
 Gorai
 Kora Kendra
 Vazira Naka
 Babhai
 Chikuwadi
 Yogi Nagar

Borivali (East) 
 Magathane
 Nancy Colony
 Sukurwadi

Dahisar 

 NL Complex
 Mandapeshwar Caves
 Northern heights
 Shakti Nagar
 Anand Nagar
 Ketkipada
 Anand Park
 Krishna Colony
 Rawalpada
 Ashok Van
 Balaji Colony
 Ekta Colony
 Maratha Nagar
 Konkani pada
 CS Complex
 Avdhut Nagar
 Narendra Complex
 Shanti Nagar
 Yadav Nagar
 Gavde Nagar
 Ganpat Patil Marg
 Navagaon
 Mhatre Wadi Tadwe Wadi

Goregaon 
Best Nagar
Jawahar Nagar
Aarey Milk Colony
Motilal Nagar
Bangur Nagar
Gokuldham
Jayprakash Nagar
Pandhurang wadi
NESCO colony

Jogeshwari 
Amrut Nagar
Kevni Pada
Behram Baug
Malcolm Bau
Patliputra Nagar
Vahatuk Nagar
Vaishali Nagar
Sainik Nagar
Patilwadi
Dnyaneshwar Marg
Shastri Nagar 
Azad Nagar
Khan Estate
Pratiksha Nagar
BR Nagar
Momin Nagar
Prabhat Nagar
Kadam Nagar
Ambivali
Mahatma Jyotiba Phule Nagar
Patel Estate
Prathmesh Complex
Somani Gram
Gautam Nagar 
Adarsh Nagar
Balasaheb Thackeray Flyover
JVLR 
Gupha Tekdi
Poonam Nagar
Squatters Colony
Samarth Nagar
Shyam Nagar
Seetawadi
Janata Colony
Kranti Nagar
Rup Nagar
Majas Wadi
Morga Pada
Natwar Nagar
Samarth Nagar
Namesingh Chawl
Oberoi Splendor
Anand Nagar
Shankar Wadi
Pratap Nagar
Sunder Nagar
Jijamata Colony

Juhu

Kandivali west 

 Dahanukar Wadi
 Charkop
 Poisar
 Hindustan Naka
 Mahavir Nagar

Kandivali east 
 Samta Nagar
 Damu nagar
 Thakur complex
 Thakur village
 Lokhandwala township
 Akurli road
 Janupada
 Hanuman Nagar
 Kranti Nagar
 Laxmi Nagar
 Dattani
 Jivali Pada

Khar 
 Pali Naka
 Khar Danda
 21th Road
 18th Road
 16th Road
 14th Road
 Ambedkar Road

Malad

 Dindoshi
 Sunder Nagar
 Pathanwadi
 Rani Sati Marg
 Malvani
 Ambujwadi
 Evershine Nagar
 Liliya Nagar

Mira-Bhayandar 
Indralok Phase 1
Indralok Phase 2
Indralok Phase 3
Mira Road
Bhayandar
Uttan
Kashimira
Bhayandar East
Bhayandar West
Mira Road East 
Naya Nagar
Sheetal Nagar
Shanti Nagar
Kanakia
Beverley
Queens Park
Srishti
Ramdev Park
Medtiya Nagar
Pleasant Park 
Vinay Park
Penkarpada
Gcc Club
Mira gaon
Bhayandar Flyover
Bhayandar Khadi
Jesal park
Bhayandar railway Station
Bhayandar Subway
Bhayandar Creek Bridge

Santacruz East 
 Kalina
 Vakola
 Prabhat colony
 Anand Nagar
 New Agripada
 Chaitanya Nagar
 Davri Nagar
 Shivaji Nagar
 Vakola Pipeline
 Yashwant Nagar

Santacruz West 
 Juhu Koliwada
 Pothohar Nagar
 Gazdhar Bandh
 Agripada

Vile Parle 

 Irla

Naigaon
Naigaon East
Naigaon West

Vasai
Vasai East
Vasai West

Eastern Suburbs

Bhandup 
 Shivaji Talav
Hanuman Nagar
Pratap Nagar
Maharashtra Nagar
Jamil Nagar
Utkarsh Nagar
Samarth Nagar
Tulshet Pada
Sonapur
Sahyadri Nagar
Sarvoday Nagar

Ghatkopar 
Amrut Nagar
Asalfa
Garodia Nagar
Jagdusha Nagar
Pant Nagar

Kanjurmarg

Kurla 
Nehru Nagar
	Kasaiwada
	Quresh Nagar
	Tashilanagar
	Umerwadi
	Ali dada estate
	Takiya wad
	Machi market
	Kapadia nagar
	Khadi
	Court
	Taximen colony
	Halav pool
	Makad wali chawal
	MIG
	LIG
	Bachan tabela
	Pipe road
	Mubarak complex
	Vinobha bhave 
	Kohinoor City
	Christian Gaon
	Jagruti Nagar
	9 number
	Rajiv Gandhi Nagar
	Lal Taki
	Charbi Gali
	Kamela
	Taxi Stand
	Diamond
	Galaxy
	Bail Bazar
	Kaju Pada

Mulund 

 Bombay Colony
 Paach Rasta
 Xavier Street

Nahur

 Mulund Runwals

Powai
Chandivali
Hiranandani Gardens
Indian Institute of Technology Bombay campus
BSNL Colony
Passpoli
Mhada Colony 19
Morarji Nagar

Vidyavihar
 Rajawadi
 Pipeline Road
 Kirol

Vikhroli
Gandhi Nagar
Surya Nagar
Kannamwar Nagar
Tagore Nagar
Park Site
Godrej Station Colony
Godrej Hillside Colony
Godrej Creek
 Thane
Thane East
Thane West
Thane Mulund Toll plaza
Ghodbunder
Dombivali
Mumbra
Majipada
Hiranandani
Tikujini Wadi
Manpada
Kolshet Road
Naupada
Anand nagar
Eastern Express Highway
Patlipada
Shree Nagar
Kalyan
Badlapur
Ambernath
Thakurli
Diva
Bhiwandi

Harbour Suburbs

Chembur
 Chembur Causeway
 Union Park
 Aloysius Soares Road
 Central Avenue
 St Anthony's Road
 St Gregorious Path
 Golf Club Road
 St Sebastian's Marouli village
 Pestom Sagar
 Basant Park
 Diamond Garden
 Chedda Nagar
 Indian Oil Nagar
 St Francis of Assisi Nagar
 Swastik Park
 Maitri Park
 Atur Park
 Sindhi Society
 Punjabwadi
 Chembur Camp
 Ghatla village
 Borla village
 Deonar Farm Road
 Subhash Nagar
 Sion Trombay Road | VN Purao Marg
 Wadavali village
 Maravali
 Julianwadi
 P L Lokhande Marg
 Thakkar Bappa Colony
 Suman Nagar
 Postal Colony
 Shell Colony
 Sahakar Nagar
 Tilak Nagar
 New Tilak Nagar
 Mahul
 Vashinaka
 Mahul Village
 Panjarpol
 Siddharth Colony
 Ramakrishna Chemburkar Marg
 Bhakti Park
 RCF
 Mysore Colony
 Collector Colony
 Trombay
 Anushakti Nagar
 Vishnu Nagar
 HP nagar
 BPCL
 Deonar

Wadala
 Sangam Nagar
 BPT Colony
 Sahakar Nagar
 C.G.S Colony
 Antop Hill

Govandi
Deonar
 Shivaji Nagar
 Gautam Nagar

Mankhurd

 Mandala
 Cheeta Camp
 Trombay koliwada
 Lallubhai Compound

Trombay
 Trombay Koliwada
 Cheetah Camp
 Mandala

South Mumbai
 Agripada
 Altamount Road
 Bhuleshwar
 Breach Candy
 Carmichael Road
 Cavel
 Churchgate
 Cotton Green
 Cuffe Parade
 Cumbala Hill
 Currey Road
 Dhobitalao
 Dongri
 Kala Ghoda
 Kemps Corner
 Lalbaug
 Lower Parel
 Mahalaxmi
 Mahim
 Malabar Hill
 Marine Drive, Mumbai
 Marine Lines
 Mumbai Central
Malbar Hill
Nagpada
 Nariman Point
 Prabhadevi
 Sion
 Walkeshwar
 Worli

Antop Hill
C.G.S. colony

Byculla
Dagdi Chawl
Ghodapdeo

Colaba
Navy Nagar

Dadar
Hindu colony
Parsi Colony

Fort
Ballard Estate

Girgaon
Khotachiwadi

Kalbadevi
Abdul Rehman Street
Agiary Lane
Anant Wadi
Arthur Road Junction
Badam Wadi
Balaji Mandir 
Bhuleshwar
Bhuleshwar Road 
Cavel Cross Lane
Champa Wadi
Chandanwadi Road 
Chira Bazaar  
Clive Road
Cotton Exchange 
Cumbala Hill 
Dadasaheb Parulekar Marg
Dadiseth Agiary Lane
Dhanji Street 
Dhirubhai Parekh Marg  
Dr. Atmaram Merchant Road
Dr. M.B. Velkar Street 
Dr. Viegas Street 
Fanas Wadi 
Fofal Wadi 
Gaiwadi Lane
Gaushala 
Gulal Wadi 
Haines Road
Hollvard Road
Jagannath Shankarseth (JSS) Road 
Kalbadevi Road
Kavi Nirav Lane
Kazi Syed Street
Khodad Circle
Kika Street
Kolbhat Lane 
Lohar Chawl
M.J. Market
Malharrao Wadi
Mangaladevi Marg 
Mirza Street 
Nagdevi Cross Street
Narayan Dhuru Street
Old Satta Gully 
Panjrapole Lane 
Pophalwadi 
Premkumar Sharma Road 
Ram Wadi
Shaikh Memon Street 
Shrikant Palekar Marg 
Sitaram Poddar Marg 
Swadeshi Market 
Tambakata 
Tatya Gharpure Marg 
Thakurdwar Road
Vithal Wadi 
Vithoba Lane 
Zaveri Baazar

Kamathipura
Chor Bazaar

Matunga
Veermata Jijabai Technological Institute
Five Gardens
Institute of Chemical Technology

Parel
Lalbaug

Tardeo
Gowalia Tank
Nana Chowk

Other
 Dava Bazaar
 Dharavi
 Jankalyan Nagar
 Kajuwadi
 Koliwada
 Koombarwara

References

Mumbai neighbourhood coordinates

Mumbra Eastern Suburbs Mumbai

 
Mumbai
Mumbai-related lists